Horace Andy (born Horace Hinds, 19 February 1951) is a Jamaican roots reggae songwriter and singer, known for his distinctive vocals and hit songs such as "Government Land", as well as "Angel", "Spying Glass" and "Five Man Army" with English trip hop duo Massive Attack. He is also famous for a cover version of "Ain't No Sunshine". Andy is often described as one of the most respected and influential singers in Jamaica.

Biography

Early days
Born in Kingston, Jamaica, Hinds recorded his first single, "This is a Black Man's Country," in 1967 for producer Phil Pratt. "This is a Black Man's Country" failed to make an impact, and it wouldn't be until 1970 that he achieved a breakthrough. After unsuccessfully auditioning at Coxsone Dodd's Studio One as a duo along with Frank Melody, he successfully auditioned on his own a few days later. Dodd decided Hinds should record as Horace Andy, partly to capitalise on the popularity of Bob Andy, and partly to avoid comparisons with his cousin, Justin Hinds, with whom his singing style at the time showed a resemblance. "Got To Be Sure", the song he had auditioned with, became his first release for Studio One. The following two years saw the release of further singles such as "See a Man's Face", "Night Owl", "Fever", and "Mr. Bassie". One of Andy's most enduring songs, "Skylarking", first appeared on Dodd's Jamaica Today compilation album, but after proving a sound system success, it was released as a single, going on to top the Jamaican chart. The next few years saw Andy regularly in the reggae charts with further singles for Dodd such as "Something on My Mind", "Love of a Woman", "Just Say Who", and "Every Tongue Shall Tell", as well as singles for other producers such as "Lonely Woman" (for Derrick Harriott), "Girl I Love You" (Ernest and Joseph Hoo Kim), "Love You to Want Me" and "Delilah" (Gussie Clarke), and "Get Wise", "Feel Good", and "Money Money" for Phil Pratt. Andy had a second Jamaican number one single in 1973 with "Children of Israel". Andy's most successful association with a producer, however, was with Bunny Lee in the middle part of the 1970s. This era produced a series of singles now regarded as classics such as a re-recorded "Skylarking", "Just Say Who", "Don't Try To Use Me", "You Are My Angel", "Zion Gate", "I've Got to Get Away", and a new version of "Something on My Mind".

In 1977, Andy moved to Hartford, Connecticut, with his first wife, Claudette, where he recorded for Everton DaSilva, including the In The Light album and its associated dub album, and singles such as "Do You Love My Music" and "Government Land". Andy set up his own Rhythm label, which became an outlet for his work with DaSilva. The association with the producer was brought to an abrupt end when DaSilva was murdered in 1979. Andy's 1978 album Pure Ranking had anticipated the rise of dancehall reggae, and he was a key figure in the early development of the genre, confirmed by 1982's Dance Hall Style album. Andy continued to record with a variety of producers in the first half of the 1980s. In 1985, with his second wife Caroline, he relocated to Ladbroke Grove, London, and he recorded in the United Kingdom as well as regularly visiting Jamaica for further recording work.

Mainstream success with Massive Attack and after
1990 saw Andy's profile further raised when he began collaborating with Bristol trip hop pioneers Massive Attack, going on to contribute to all five of their albums (the only artist to do so), most notably on "Angel" (a new version of "You Are My Angel"), released on their third album, Mezzanine, and later on their 2010 release Heligoland with the tracks "Splitting the Atom" and "Girl I Love You". In the mid-1990s he also worked with Mad Professor, releasing the albums Life Is For Living and Roots and Branches. He then continued to record new music, with the album Living in the Flood, released in 1999 on Massive Attack's Melankolic record label, and Mek It Bun in 2002. He also featured on the world music project 1 Giant Leap and on the Easy Star All-Stars 2006 album Radiodread.

2022 saw the release of Andy's album Midnight Rocker, produced by Adrian Sherwood of On-U Sound. Andy's vocals were recorded in Jamaica, with the tracks sent back and forth between vocalist and producer until they were complete. The album received critical acclaim upon its release.

Personal life
Andy is a Rastafarian. 

Some of his lyrics have been criticized for being homophobic. Andy confirmed that Trojan Records only agreed to release his album On Tour after removing a track containing the lyrics "The Father never make Adam and Steve, he make Adam and Eve".

Discography

Albums
 Skylarking (1972) Studio One
 You Are My Angel (1973) Trojan
 Earth Must Be Hell (1974) Atra (with Winston Jarrett) aka The Kingston Rock
 Earth Must Be Hell – Dub (1974) Atra (with Winston Jarrett)
 In the Light (1977) Hungry Town
 In the Light Dub (1977) Hungry Town
 Pure Ranking (1978) Clocktower
 Bim Sherman Meets Horace Andy and U Black Inna Rub a Dub Style (1980) Yard International (with Bim Sherman and U Black)
 Natty Dread a Weh She Want (1980) New Star
 Unity Showcase (1981) Pre (with Errol Scorcher)
 Dance Hall Style (1982) Wackies aka Exclusively (1982) Solid Groove
 Showcase (1984) Vista Sounds
 Confusion (1984) Music Hawk
 Sings For You and I (1985) Striker Lee
 Clash of the Andy's (1985) Thunderbolt (with Patrick Andy)
 Elementary (1985) Rough Trade – Horace Andy & Rhythm Queen
 Reggae Superstars Meet (1986) Striker Lee (with Dennis Brown)
 From One Extreme to Another (1986) Beta (with John Holt)
 Haul & Jack Up (1987) Live & Love
 Fresh (1988) Island in the Sun
 Shame and Scandal (1988)
 Everyday People (1988) Wackies
 Rude Boy (1993) Shanachie
 Jah Shaka Meets Horace Andy (1994) Jah Shaka Music
 Dub Salute 1 Featuring Horace Andy (1994) Jah Shaka Music
 Seek and You Will Find (1995) Blackamix International
 Seek and You Will Find – The Dub Pieces (1995) Blackamix International
 Life Is for Living (1995) Ariwa
 Roots and Branches (1997) Ariwa
 See and Blind (1998) Heartbeat
 Living in the Flood (1999) Melankolic
 Mek It Bun (2002) Wrasse
 From the Roots: Horace Andy Meets Mad Professor RAS
 This World (2005) Attack
 Livin' It Up (2007) Medium (with Sly & Robbie)
 On Tour (2008) Sanctuary
 Two Phazed People (2009) dontTouch (with Alpha)
 Serious Times (2010)
 Broken Beats (2013), Echo Beach
 Live It Up (2019), Pioneer International
 Midnight Rocker (2022), On-U Sound

Contributing artist
 The Rough Guide to Dub (2005) World Music Network

References

External links

 Searchable discography at Roots Archives
 Interview with Horace Andy (2014) on Reggae.Today

Jamaican reggae musicians
1951 births
Living people
Musicians from Kingston, Jamaica
Converts to the Rastafari movement
Performers of Rastafarian music
Jamaican Rastafarians
Tenors
Wrasse Records artists
Trojan Records artists
Trip hop musicians